North East District was a district command of the British Army from 1967 and 1992.

History

The district was formed from 50th (Northumbrian) Infantry Division as part of the Territorial Army Volunteer Reserve in 1967. It had its headquarters at Imphal Barracks, and was placed under the command of HQ UK Land Forces in 1972. The district merged with Eastern District to form an enlarged Eastern District at Imphal Barracks in 1992.

Commanders
General officers commanding included:
1967–1968 Major-General Rex Whitworth
1968–1970 Major-General John Ward-Harrison
1970–1973 Major-General Geoffrey Armitage
1973 Major-General John Ward-Harrison
1973–1976 Major-General Geoffrey Collin
1976–1980 Major-General Henry Woods
1980–1982 Major-General Ian Baker
1982–1984 Major-General Patrick Palmer
1984–1986 Major-General Peter Inge
1986–1987 Major-General Charles Guthrie
1987–1989 Major-General Murray Naylor
1989–1991 Major-General Michael Rose
1991–1992 Major-General Michael Walker

References

Districts of the British Army
Military units and formations established in 1967
Military units and formations disestablished in 1992